HMS Jersey was a member of the standardize 20-gun sixth rates built at the end of the 17th Century. After commissioning she spent most of her career in the West Indies. She was wrecked there in October 1707.

Jersey was the second named vessel since it was used for a 48-gun fourth rate, launched by Starling of Malden in 1654, captured by the French in the West Indies on 18 December 1691, renamed Le Jersey and was in service until 1716.

Construction
She was ordered on 21 July 1693 from Deptford Dockyard to be built under the guidance of Deptford's Master Shipwright, Fisher Harding. She was launched on 17 January 1694.

Commissioned Service
She was initially commissioned under the command of Lieutenant John Triggs, RN. Just over a month later Captain Richard Paul, RN took command. Captain Thomas Fisher, RN took command on 11 April 1696 to proceed to the West Indies with a convoy. He died on 7 March 1697. On 10 March 1697 Captain Edmund Bugden, RN took command until he was dismissed by court martial in 1697. The ship was renamed HMS Margate on 21 October 1698.

She was commissioned as HMS Margate around July 1699 under Captain Thomas Urry, RN. Captain Urry died on 18 November 1699. In 1700 she was under command of Captain Philip Dawes, RN for service in America and the West Indies. In 1702 she was under Commander Charles Layton (or Laton), RN for a survey of the Irish coast. Commander John Chilley, RN took command on 6 March 1703 first for service in the North Sea followed by service in the Leeward Islands between 1704 and 05. She returned home in 1706. On 18 July Commander Samuel Meade, RN took command for service in the Leeward Islands.

Disposition
HMS Jersey was near Cartagena on the Columbian Coast on 9 October 1707.

Notes

Citations

References
 Winfield, British Warships in the Age of Sail (1603 – 1714), by Rif Winfield, published by Seaforth Publishing, England © 2009, EPUB , Chapter 6, The Sixth Rates, Vessels acquired from 18 December 1688, Sixth Rates of 20 guns and up to 26 guns, Maidstone Group, Jersey
 Colledge, Ships of the Royal Navy, by J.J. Colledge, revised and updated by Lt Cdr Ben Warlow and Steve Bush, published by Seaforth Publishing, Barnsley, Great Britain, © 2020, e  (EPUB), Section J (Jersey)

 

1690s ships
Corvettes of the Royal Navy
Naval ships of the United Kingdom